Oberer Murgsee (or "Ober Murgsee") is a lake in the Murg valley (Murgtal), in the canton of St. Gallen, Switzerland. It is the highest of the three Murgseen.

The lake is drained by the Murgbach which empties into Lake Walen at Murg (municipality of Quarten).

See also
List of mountain lakes of Switzerland

External links

Lakes of Switzerland
Lakes of the canton of St. Gallen